As of February 2021, German low-cost carrier Eurowings serves the following destinations throughout Africa, Asia and Europe.

In October 2015, Eurowings began to serve several destinations formerly served by the Germanwings brand. In early 2021, Eurowings removed all of their long-haul destinations, which had been served from Düsseldorf, Munich and Frankfurt from their network. In the same time, parent Lufthansa announced the foundation of their new long-haul carrier Eurowings Discover.

Destinations

References

Lists of airline destinations